Unbreakable Kimmy Schmidt is an American sitcom created by Tina Fey and Robert Carlock, starring Ellie Kemper in the title role, that has streamed on Netflix since March 6, 2015. Originally set for a 13-episode first season on NBC for spring 2015, the show was sold to Netflix and given a two-season order. The fourth and final season concluded on January 25, 2019. On May 8, 2019, it was announced that the series would return with an interactive special, which premiered on May 12, 2020.

The series follows 29-year-old Kimmy Schmidt (Kemper) as she adjusts to life in New York City after her rescue from a doomsday cult in Indiana where she and three other women had been held by Reverend Richard Wayne Gary Wayne (Jon Hamm) for 15 years. Determined to be seen as something other than a victim and armed only with a positive attitude, Kimmy decides to restart her life by moving to New York City, where she quickly befriends her street-wise landlady Lillian Kaushtupper (Carol Kane), finds a roommate in struggling actor Titus Andromedon (Tituss Burgess), and gains a job as a nanny for the melancholy and out-of-touch socialite Jacqueline Voorhees (Jane Krakowski). With their help, Kimmy struggles to adapt to an unfamiliar world and jump-start the adult life that had been taken away from her.

Series overview

Episodes

Season 1 (2015)

Season 2 (2016)

Season 3 (2017)

Season 4 (2018–19)

Special (2020)

References

Lists of American LGBT-related television series episodes
Lists of American sitcom episodes
Episode list